Čengić is a village in the municipality of Bijeljina, Republika Srpska, Bosnia and Herzegovina.

About Čengić

To the north of Čengić is Modran while to the east is Obrijež and Ruhotina. Čengić is part of the municipality of Bijeljina which lies on the flat rich planes of Semberija.

Population
The population census in 1991 showed Čengić had 1.284 inhabitants. 1278 were Serbs, 1 was Yugoslav, and 7 were of other nationalities.

External links 

  (Serbian)

References

Bijeljina
Populated places in Bijeljina